The campaigns of the American Civil War are categorized in various ways. The U.S. Army Institute of Heraldry has identified 25 campaigns that are used for streamers, decorative devices attached to unit flags that denote participation in historic battles or campaigns. (An alternative campaign categorization is that of the National Park Service, charged with maintaining Civil War battlefields and other historic sites. This categorization is more detailed and inclusive than the Army heraldry version, particularly for actions outside the Eastern Theater and Western Theater; see :Category:Campaigns of the American Civil War.)

The Civil War campaign streamers are equally divided with blue and gray. Units that received campaign credit as a Confederate unit (only applicable to some current Army National Guard units from Southern states) use the same ribbon with the colors reversed. Blue refers to Federal service and gray to Confederate. Joined together they represent the unification of the country after the Civil War.

The following inscriptions in yellow, shown in all capital letters, are authorized on the streamers:

References 

 
Civil